Stéphane Cornicard is a multilingual actor and director (French, English, German, Spanish and Italian), who trained in France with François David, French director and writer, at Colby College, U.S. and at Goldsmiths, University of London, UK.

Career

Cornicard's many credits include Jean in Saving Private Ryan by Steven Spielberg, Liquid Snake in Metal Gear and Gabe Logan in Syphon Filter, the evil Count Raum in Primal, enigmatic profiler Gerd Hanke in Evidence: The Last Ritual by Eric Viennot, the narration for Napoleon Bonaparte in the video game Napoleon: Total War in English, French, German and Spanish (as well as voicing Charlemagne in the later Total War: Attila, the voice of the character Riordan in BioWare's Dragon Age: Origins, and Stroud in Dragon Age II and Dragon Age: Inquisition.  He gave his voice to the French Red Cross for their anti-personal landmines campaign. He also played the character Lonesome Gavlan in FromSoftware's Dark Souls II (English version).

Cornicard appeared in the Doctor Who audio drama The Next Life. He also presents Ma France, web based French classes and podcasts for BBC.

Stéphane Cornicard stars as hapless truffle hunter Jean Dubois in Tom Tagholm's A Bout de Truffe, winner of TCM Classic Shorts Film Competition 2007, Best Film, Best UK Short at Raindance Film Festival 2007, Grand Jury Award at Dances with Film Festival 2007.

Partial filmography
Saving Private Ryan (1998) - Jean
Sky Captain and the World of Tomorrow (2004) - French Broadcaster
Brideshead Revisited (2008) - Doctor Henri
Spirit of the Forest (2008) - Twins (voice)
Jack and the Cuckoo-Clock Heart (2013) - Georges Méliès (English version, voice)
Spectre (2015) - Head of Nation #3

Television
Come Fly With Me (2011) - French passenger (1 episode)

Video games
Metal Gear Solid (1998) - Liquid Snake
Driver 3 (2004) - Henri Vauban
Syphon Filter (1999 - 2007) - Gabriel Logan
Medieval II: Total War (2006) - French general
Dragon Age: Origins (2009) - Riordan
Napoleon: Total War (2010) - Napoleon Bonaparte
Dragon Age II (2011) - Stroud/Hubert
Total War: Shogun 2: Fall of the Samurai (2012) - French veteran
Dragon Age: Inquisition (2014) - Stroud
Total War: Attila Age of Charlemagne expansion (2015) - Charlemagne
Overwatch (2016) - Maximilien
Total War: Warhammer (2016) - Louen Leonceour
Dark Souls III (2016) - Greirat of the Undead Settlement
Bohemian Killing (2016) - Alfred Ethon
Total War: Warhammer II (2017) - Louen Leonceour
Horizon Zero Dawn (2017) - Patrick Brochard-Klein
A Plague Tale: Innocence (2019) - Vitalis Benevent
Control (2019) - Ahti
Age of Empires II: Definitive Edition (2019) - Guy Josselyne
Expeditions: Rome (2022) - Syneros
Total War: Warhammer III (2022) - Louen Leonceour

References

External links

 « Les Rendez-vous d'Eva »  starring Christine Hasne & Stephane Cornicard
 BBC languages
 A bout de truffe
 Domestic Violence TV Spot
 Compilation
 Napoleon: Total War

Living people
Actors  from Normandy
French male film actors
French male television actors
French male voice actors
French male video game actors
Colby College alumni
Alumni of Goldsmiths, University of London
Year of birth missing (living people)